The U.S. Post Office and Courthouse–Glasgow Main in Glasgow, Montana was built in 1939.  Also known as Glasgow Post Office and Courthouse and as Glasgow Main Post Office, it was designed by Louis A. Simon in Starved Classicism style.  It served historically as a courthouse and as a post office.  It was listed on the National Register of Historic Places in 1986.

References

Post office buildings on the National Register of Historic Places in Montana
Courthouses on the National Register of Historic Places in Montana
Government buildings completed in 1939
National Register of Historic Places in Valley County, Montana
1939 establishments in Montana
Stripped Classical architecture in the United States
Glasgow, Montana